Gottschee refers to a former German-speaking region in Carniola, a crownland of the Habsburg Empire, part of the historical and traditional region of Lower Carniola, now in Slovenia. The region has been a county, duchy, district, and municipality during various parts of its history. The term often also refers to the entire ethnolinguistic enclave regardless of administrative borders. Today Gottschee largely corresponds to the Municipality of Kočevje. The original German settlers of the region are called Gottschee Germans or Gottscheers, and their German dialect is called Gottschee German or Gottscheerish.

Geography
The Gottschee enclave encompassed a roughly oval-shaped area between 45° 46′ N and 45° 30′ N, and between 14° 36′ E and 15° 9′ E. Geographers divided the enclave into seven regions based on valleys (from west to east):
 The Suchen Plateau in the extreme west, with the (pre-1933) municipalities of Obergras and Suchen;
 The Back District in the west, with the municipalities of Göttenitz, Hinterberg, Masern, Morobitz, Rieg, and Tiefenbach;
 The Upper District in the central area, with the municipalities of Lienfeld, Mitterdorf, and Seele, plus the city of Gottschee;
 The Lower District in the south-central area, with the municipalities of Graflinden, Mösel, Schwarzenbach, and Unterlag;
 The Forest District  in the north-central area, with the municipalities of Altlag, Ebenthal, Langenton, and Malgern;
 The Tschermoschnitz District in the northeast, with the municipalities of Pöllandl, Stockendorf, and Tschermoschnitz;
 The Lower Side in the southeast, with the municipalities of Nesseltal and Unterdeutschau.

History

Early history (13th century1623)
The Gottschee region was conferred upon the Counts of Ortenburg by the Patriarchate of Aquileia on 20 September 1277. The territory was settled by German farmers from Carinthia and East Tyrol between 1330 and 1400. The first settlement in the territory attested in written sources was Mooswald, which appeared in a letter from Patriarch Bertram on 1 September 1339. A 1363 letter mentioned the settlements of Gottschee, Pölland, Kostel, Ossilnitz, and Göttenitz. The town of Gottschee acquired market town status in 1377.

With the extinction of the House of Ortenburg in 1418, the Gottschee area came under the control of the Counts of Celje in 1420. When the House of Celje died out in 1456, the territory came under the control of the House of Habsburg, dukes of Carniola. Emperor Frederick III elevated the town of Gottschee to a city in 1471.

The late 15th century began a time of unrest in Gottschee. Numerous Ottoman attacks took place in the region (in 1469, 1471, 1476, 1480, 1491, 1507, 1528, 1546, 1559, 1561, 1564, 1578, and 1584). It was partly in response to the devastation of the Ottoman raids that Emperor Frederick III granted the people of Gottschee the right to sell goods outside the territory in 1492. There were also six peasant uprisings in the territory, starting in 1515 and ending in 1662.

In 1507 Maximilian I mortgaged the Dominion of Gottschee (German: Herrschaft Gottschee) to Count Jörg von Thurn. The territory was purchased by Hans Ungnad in 1524, and then mortgaged to the Croatian County of Blagay in 1547. In 1574, Gottschee extended from Mount Snežnik in the extreme west to Blatnik pri Črmošnjicah in the east, and from Seč and Gornja Topla Reber in the north to just below Bosljiva Loka and Osilnica in the south. In 1619 the territory was purchased by the Khisl family.

Gottschee County (1623–1791)
The territory was elevated to Gottschee County (German: Grafschaft Gottschee) in 1623. In 1641 Wolf Engelbert von Auersperg purchased Gottschee County from Count Georg Zwickl-Khisl for 84,000 florins. Engelbert abandoned the deteriorating castle at Friedrichstein and built a new castle in the town of Gottschee itself, which survived until the Second World War. Because Gottschee was a county, Engelbert thereby became a count himself. Because he died without an heir in 1673, the county passed to his brother Johann Weikhard of Auersperg, who had become a prince of the Holy Roman Empire in 1653. He combined Gottschee with some neighboring estates into a single domain. In 1774 Emperor Joseph II issued a patent allowing the residents of Gottschee County to sell citrus fruit and oil, and the emperor issued a patent confirming peddling privileges on 27 April 1785.

Duchy of Gottschee (1791–1809)

In 1791 Emperor Leopold II elevated the territory to the Duchy of Gottschee (German: Herzogtum Gottschee) and Karl Josef Anton von Auersperg to the Duke of Gottschee.

Illyrian Provinces (1809–1814)
During the short-lived period of the Illyrian Provinces, Gottschee was part of the Napoleonic French Empire. Under this arrangement it was initially part of the Province of Ljubljana from 1809 to 1811, and then the Province of Carniola from 1811 to 1814. Gottschee constituted a separate administrative canton under this arrangement. The Gottscheers revolted against French rule during the 1809 Gottscheer Rebellion, killing the commissar of the Novo Mesto district, Von Gasparini. With the collapse of the Illyrian provinces, Gottschee was returned to Habsburg rule within the Kingdom of Illyria.

Kingdom of Illyria (1816–1849)

As part of the Habsburg Kingdom of Illyria, Gottschee was administratively part of the Novo Mesto District (German: Neustädtler Kreis). The Kingdom of Illyria was succeeded by the reconstituted Duchy of Carniola in 1849.

Duchy of Carniola (1849–1918)

Within the Duchy of Carniola, a separate administrative Gottschee District (German: Bezirk Gottschee or Gerichtsbezirk Gottschee) was set up. The Gottschee District was bordered (clockwise) by the districts of Ribnica, Žužemberk, Novo Mesto, Metlika, and Črnomelj. Fully German or ethnically mixed Slovene-German territory extended into all of the neighboring districts. On 31 December 1869 the entire Kočevje District had 3,473 houses and a population of 18,432. Subtracting the ethnically Slovene comminuties of Osilnica and Kostel left a total of 2,966 houses and a population of 15,520 in ethnically German or German-majority territory in the district itself. Adding in ethnically German houses and population from communities adjacent to the district resulted in a total of 4,161 houses and a population of 21,301 in the culturally German Gottschee area. Czörnig estimated the total Gottschee German population in 1878, accounting for population growth and men working away from home, to be about 25,000.

In 1906 the ethnic Romanian Austro-Hungarian lawyer and politician Aurel Popovici unsuccessfully proposed the reorganization of Austria-Hungary as the United States of Greater Austria. Popovici's proposal included Gottschee as a separate autonomous district within the proposed state of Carniola.

Kingdom of Yugoslavia (1918–1941)
Gottschee was incorporated into royal Yugoslavia (known as the Kingdom of Serbs, Croats and Slovenes until 1929) as part of the prewar territory of Carniola. The Gottschee Germans accepted the new arrangement with some reluctance: in February 1918 Gottschee's ethnically German priests characterized the proposed new state as "treacherous" and sent a letter to Bishop Anton Bonaventura Jeglič in Ljubljana denouncing the plan. In October 1918 a proposal was prepared for the Paris Peace Conference for Gottschee to become an independent republic (German: Republik Gottschee) under American protection, based on the large Gottschee German population in the United States, and a Gottschee German demonstration demanding autonomy was held in New York in January 1919. There were also unsuccessful proposals to establish a Gottschee Republic with Italian backing. In 1920, the Slovene press characterized the proposal for a Gottschee Republic as communist agitation.

Under the 1921 constitution, the traditional regions were abolished and Gottschee was made part of the Ljubljana Province from 1922 to 1929. After the provinces were abolished, Gottschee was part of the larger Drava Banovina from 1929 to 1941. Within the very large Kočevje District, 22 local communities or small municipalities largely encompassed Gottschee territory until 1933, continuing its 19th-century organization. Many Gottschee settlements were outside the Kočevje District. In 1933 a Yugoslav administrative reform created large municipalities organized within the districts. The Kočevje District was the largest district in the Drava Banovina, extending from Veliki Ločnik in the north to the Croatian border in the south. Gottschee territory was encompassed by 11 large municipalities, not all of which were in the Kočevje District.

During this time, political and assimilatory pressure against the German minority caused many of Gottschee Germans to emigrate: the German-language high school was closed in 1918, German was eliminated as an elective subject in schools in 1925, the majority of German business, cultural, and athletics societies were dissolved, and there was forced Slovenization of the names of villages and people. By 1941 the Gottschee German population had fallen to only about 12,500. Most of the Germans fled back to Austria or emigrated to the United States (mainly New York City or Cleveland, Ohio.)

Second World War
After the outbreak of World War II in 1939, Yugoslavia initially remained neutral, but after a coup in 1941 adopted a staunch anti-Axis position. This led to a German and Italian invasion and occupation of the Kingdom. The Gottscheers were in the Italian occupation zone after Yugoslavia's surrender, which Hitler could not abide. Nazi racial policy dictated that these Germans had to be brought back into the Reich. The Nazis established a branch of the Resettlement Administration (or "VoMi") at Maribor for this purpose.

While some of the Gottscheer community leaders had embraced National Socialism and agitated for "assistance" and "repatriation" to the Reich before the German invasion in 1941, most Gottscheers had no interest in reuniting with Greater Germany or joining the Nazis. They had been integrated into society with their Slovene neighbours, often intermarrying among Slovenes and becoming bilingual while maintaining their Germanic language and customs since their arrival in the region in the late 14th century.

However, propaganda and Nazi ideology prevailed, and the VoMi began planning the Gottschee "resettlement" (forced expulsion) from Kočevje, which was in the Italian occupation zone, to the "Ranner Dreieck" or Brežice Triangle in Lower Styria, the region now known as the Lower Sava Valley, located between the confluences of the Krka, Sotla, and Sava rivers.

In November 1941, some 46,000 Slovenians in the Brežice Triangle region were forcibly deported to Eastern Germany for potential Germanization or forced labour in order to make an accommodation for the Gottschee "resettlers". Shortly before that time, a largely transparent propaganda effort was aimed toward both the Gottscheers and the Slovenes, promising the latter equivalent farmland in Germany for the land relinquished. The Gottscheers were given Reich passports and transportation to the Lower Sava Valley just after the forced departure of the Slovenes. Most Gottschee left their homes because of coercion and threats since the VoMi had a deadline of December 31, 1941 for the mass movement of both groups. Though many Gottscheers did receive farmland and households, these were of lesser quality than their own, and many were in disarray from the hasty forced expulsion of the Slovenians. Gottscheers were removed from a total of 167 settlements in 1941 and 1942.

The eviction was organized as a series of 25 resettlement groups (German: Stürme), numbered Go 1 through Go 25 and named after major settlements:

Although from the time of their arrival to the end of the war, Gottschee farmers were harassed and killed by Josip Broz Tito's Partisans, 56 of the Gottschee ethnic Germans, who did not want to leave their homes, decided instead to join Slovene Partisans and fight against Italians in Province of Ljubljana, together with their Slovene neighbours.

The attempt to resettle the Gottscheers was a costly failure for the Nazi regime, since extra manpower was required to protect the farmers from the partisans. The deported Slovenes were taken to several camps in Saxony, where they were forced to work on German farms or in factories run by German industries from 1941 to 1945. The forced labourers were not always kept in formal Nazi concentration camps, but often just vacant buildings where they slept until the next day's labour took them outside these quarters. Toward the end of the war, these camps were liberated by American and Red Army troops, and repatriated refugees later returned to Yugoslavia.

The fate of the resettled Gottschee was not much better, and in some cases much worse. At the end of the war the Nazi regime in the region evaporated as soldiers and administrators fled.

Postwar Yugoslavia

After the war, the Gottschee area was partially resettled by Slovenians from various places, creating a mixed dialect area. Only a few hundred Gottscheers remained.

List of Gottschee German villages
This table includes villages in the 19th-century Gottschee District based on maps in Mitja Ferenc's works (2007, 2011–2013).

Notes

References

Further reading 
 Thomas F. Bencin.  Gottschee: A History of a German Community in Slovenia from the Fourteenth to the Twentieth Century.  Master's Thesis 1995.  Louisville, CO: Gottscheer Research and Genealogy Assn. 2003.
 Joseph Erker.  Jubiläums-Festbuch der Gottscheer 600-Jahrfeier: aus Anlaß des 600-jährigen Bestandes des Gottscheer Landes. Gottschee: Pavlicek, 1930.  
 Mitja Ferenc.  Kočevska: izgubljena kulturna dediščina kočevskih Nemcev; = Gottschee: Das verlorene Kulturerbe der Gottscheer Deutschen. Ljubljana: Zavod Republike Slovenije za varstvo naravne in kulturne dediščine, 1993.
 Herber Otterstädt.  Gottschee, verlorene Heimat deutscher Waldbauern, 1962.  
 Petschauer, Erich. 1980. Das Jahrhundertbuch der Gottscheer. Klagenfurt: Hermann Leustik 
 
 Zdravko Troha (2004) Kočevski Nemci – partizani; = Gottschee Germans – Partisans [Pokrajinski muzej Kočevje, Arhiv Slovenije]. Ljubljana: Slovensko kočevarsko društvo Peter Kosler. 
 John Tschinkel. The Bells Ring No More: An autobiography of the author and the history and fate of the Gottschee of Slovenia.

External links 
 www.gottschee.at Website of Gottscheer societies
 www.gottschee.de Information on history and culture of the Gottscheer Germans.
 www.gottschee.com  Website with audio folklore samples from Gottscheers in the United States.
 Gottscheer Heritage and Genealogy Association (GHGA) website "founded in 1992 to preserve the culture, history, and genealogical records of Gottscheers and Gottschee (1330–1941)"
 Peter Kosler Association, Slovenia

Geography of Lower Carniola
German diaspora in Europe
German communities
Forced migrations in Europe